The Evektor EPOS ("Electric powered small aircraft"), also called the SportStar EPOS, is a Czech electric ultralight and light-sport aircraft under development by Evektor-Aerotechnik of Kunovice. It was introduced at the AERO Friedrichshafen show in 2013.

The aircraft first flew at the end of March 2013.

Design and development
The EPOS is based upon the Evektor SportStar RTC, a Fédération Aéronautique Internationale microlight and CS-LSA light-sport aircraft. It uses the RTC model's fuselage, mated to a new wing of longer span. It features a cantilever low-wing, an enclosed cockpit with two-seats-in-side-by-side configuration under a bubble canopy, fixed tricycle landing gear and a single electric motor in tractor configuration.

The aircraft is predominantly made from aluminum sheet. In 2014 the design was upgraded with a Rotex RE BB 90-5, a brushless, DC, liquid cooled powerplant that produces  at 3,000 rpm and weighs . It is controlled by a MGM Compro HBC-Series V7, 300400/EPOS1 controller with a maximum continuous current of 300 amperes and a maximum supply voltage of 400 volts. The batteries are Kokam Company, Ltd. SLPB100216216H cells, with 45 cells connected in series, producing 378 volts.

In February 2017 the company still described the design as "under development".

Specifications (EPOS+)

References

External links

EPOS
2010s Czech ultralight aircraft
Light-sport aircraft
Single-engined tractor aircraft
Electric aircraft